Alfred Zeller (June 14, 1909 – June 4, 1988) was an American illustrator and painter born in Hamburg, Germany.

Biography 
Zeller was the son of the German portrait painter, Rudolph Jacob Zeller, and Eva Behn Zeller. Alfred Zeller's father was Jewish and his mother was a Gentile. His mother committed suicide during the Nazi occupation of Germany. Alfred Zeller had a brother named Richard.

In 1938, Alfred and Richard Zeller emigrated from Germany to Ecuador. Later, Alfred Zeller married Evelyn Josephine Monford of Galveston, Texas. In September 1944, they had a son, Gary Allen Zeller, in Houston, Texas.

Alfred Zeller's first accepted drawing was a caricature for The Times-Picayune, a New Orleans newspaper. He then drew a series of cartoon postal cards for a novelty store. When possible, Zeller spent his evenings illustrating ideas.

Zeller was the illustrator for publications by Royal Dixon, the naturalist author. Later, Zeller began painting more seriously with oils. Zeller's themes included China, the Middle East, winter scenes, still life, country scenes, portraits and abstract works including Cubism. His work was exhibited at the Lantern Lane Gallery and in numerous juried shows in the Houston area. Zeller was awarded the Purchase Prize at Weimar, Texas in 1968 and juried Houston area art shows.

Since 1964, Alfred Zeller and Chester Snowden worked together in their Thirteen Ten Art Studio and Galleries, located at 1310 Truxillo Street in Houston, Texas. They offered classes in oil painting and claimed to be the "originators of the Shiva painting technique". Alfred Zeller died in Houston, Texas at the age of 79.

References

Painters from Texas
American male painters
20th-century American painters
20th-century American male artists
People from Houston
German emigrants to the United States
1909 births
1988 deaths